The 1986 Arizona Wildcats baseball team represented the University of Arizona in the 1986 NCAA Division I baseball season. The team was coached by Jerry Kindall in his 14th season at Arizona.

The Wildcats won the College World Series, defeating the Florida State Seminoles in the championship game.

Roster

Schedule 

! style="background:#C41E3A;color:white;"| Regular Season
|- valign="top" 

|- align="center" bgcolor="#ddffdd"
| January 30 ||  || 8-6 || 1-0 || –
|- align="center" bgcolor="#ffdddd"
| January 31 || at Grand Canyon || 2-4 || 1-1 || –
|- align="center" bgcolor="#ddffdd"
| February 3 ||  || 12-2 || 2-1 || –
|- align="center" bgcolor="#ffdddd"
| February 4 || Cal State Dominguez Hills || 7-8 || 2-2 || –
|- align="center" bgcolor="#ffdddd"
| February 5 || Cal State Dominguez Hills || 10-13 || 2-3 || –
|- align="center" bgcolor="#ddffdd"
| February 6 ||  || 1-0 || 3-3 || –
|- align="center" bgcolor="#ddffdd"
| February 7 || Pepperdine || 5-4 || 4-3 || –
|- align="center" bgcolor="#ddffdd"
| February 8 || Pepperdine || 3-2 || 5-3 || –
|- align="center" bgcolor="#ddffdd"
| February 10 ||  || 15-1 || 6-3 || –
|- align="center" bgcolor="#ddffdd"
| February 11 || Western New Mexico || 20-4 || 7-3 || –
|- align="center" bgcolor="#ffdddd"
| February 13 ||  || 7-10 || 7-4 || –
|- align="center" bgcolor="#ddffdd"
| February 14 || Cal State Fullerton || 8-6 || 8-4 || –
|- align="center" bgcolor="#ffdddd"
| February 15 || Cal State Fullerton || 6-9 || 8-5 || –
|- align="center" bgcolor="#ddffdd"
| February 18 ||  || 20-1 || 9-5 || –
|- align="center" bgcolor="#ddffdd"
| February 19 || Texas Southern || 22-4 || 10-5 || –
|- align="center" bgcolor="#ddffdd"
| February 20 || Texas Southern || 15-2 || 11-5 || –
|- align="center" bgcolor="#ddffdd"
| February 21 || at  || 11-8 || 12-5 || –
|- align="center" bgcolor="#ffdddd"
| February 22 || at Hawaii || 5-9 || 12-6 || –
|- align="center" bgcolor="#ddffdd"
| February 23 || at Hawaii || 7-2 || 13-6 || –
|- align="center" bgcolor="#ffdddd"
| February 28 ||  || 4-6 || 13-7 || 1-0
|-

|- align="center" bgcolor="#ddffdd"
| March 1 || Stanford || 8-5 || 14-7 || 1-1
|- align="center" bgcolor="#ffdddd"
| March 2 || Stanford || 4-7 || 14-8 || 1-2
|- align="center" bgcolor="#ddffdd"
| March 7 || at  || 2-1 || 15-8 || 2-2
|- align="center" bgcolor="#ddffdd"
| March 9 || at  || 7-4 || 16-8 || 3-2
|- align="center" bgcolor="#ddffdd"
| March 11 ||  || 21-3 || 17-8 || –
|- align="center" bgcolor="#ddffdd"
| March 12 || Hartford || 16-4 || 18-8 || –
|- align="center" bgcolor="#ffdddd"
| March 14 || at  || 0-5 || 18-9 || 3-3
|- align="center" bgcolor="#ffdddd"
| March 15 || at Southern California || 12-14 || 18-10 || 3-4
|- align="center" bgcolor="#ddffdd"
| March 17 ||  || 12-3 || 19-10 || –
|- align="center" bgcolor="#ddffdd"
| March 18 || at Southern California || 6-3 || 20-10 || 4-4
|- align="center" bgcolor="#ddffdd"
| March 21 ||  || 14-5 || 21-10 || 5–4
|- align="center" bgcolor="#ffdddd"
| March 22 || UCLA || 5-28 || 21-11 || 5–5
|- align="center" bgcolor="#ffdddd"
| March 23 || UCLA || 9-12 || 21-12 || 5–6
|- align="center" bgcolor="#ddffdd"
| March 27 ||  || 4-2 || 22-12 || –
|- align="center" bgcolor="#ddffdd"
| March 28 || New Mexico State || 21-4 || 23-12 || –
|- align="center" bgcolor="#ddffdd"
| March 29 || New Mexico State || 9-4 || 24-12 || –
|- align="center" bgcolor="#ddffdd"
| March 31 ||  || 10-1 || 25-12 || –
|-

|- align="center" bgcolor="#ddffdd"
| April 1 || Seton Hall || 13-0 || 26-12 || –
|- align="center" bgcolor="#ddffdd"
| April 2 || Seton Hall || 12-11 || 27-12 || –
|- align="center" bgcolor="#ddffdd"
| April 4 || California || 6-3 || 28-12 || 6-6
|- align="center" bgcolor="#ddffdd"
| April 5 || California || 5-4 || 29-12 || 7-6
|- align="center" bgcolor="#ddffdd"
| April 6 || California || 11-8 || 30-12 || 8-6
|- align="center" bgcolor="#ddffdd"
| April 6 || at California || 17-16 || 31-12 || 9-6
|- align="center" bgcolor="#ffdddd"
| April 11 || at  || 9-12 || 31-13 || 9–7
|- align="center" bgcolor="#ddffdd"
| April 12 || at Arizona State || 5-3 || 32-13 || 10–7
|- align="center" bgcolor="#ffdddd"
| April 14 || at Arizona State || 5-6 || 32-14 || 10–8
|- align="center" bgcolor="#ddffdd"
| April 18 || Southern California || 10-3 || 33-14 || 11-8
|- align="center" bgcolor="#ddffdd"
| April 19 || Southern California || 9-4 || 34-14 || 12-8
|- align="center" bgcolor="#ddffdd"
| April 20 || Southern California || 19-17 || 35-14 || 13-8
|- align="center" bgcolor="#ffdddd"
| April 25 || at UCLA || 5-17 || 35-15 || 13-9
|- align="center" bgcolor="#ddffdd"
| April 26 || at UCLA || 12-4 || 36-15 || 14-9
|- align="center" bgcolor="#ffdddd"
| April 27 || at UCLA || 13-14 || 36-16 || 14-10
|-

|- align="center" bgcolor="#ddffdd"
| May 2 || at Stanford || 2-1 || 37-16 || 15-10
|- align="center" bgcolor="#ffdddd"
| May 3 || at Stanford || 4-14 || 37-17 || 15-11
|- align="center" bgcolor="#ffdddd"
| May 4 || at Stanford || 3-8 || 37-18 || 15-12
|- align="center" bgcolor="#ddffdd"
| May 12 || Grand Canyon || 9-6 || 38-18 || –
|- align="center" bgcolor="#ddffdd"
| May 16 || Arizona State || 9-4 || 39-18 || 16-12
|- align="center" bgcolor="#ddffdd"
| May 17 || Arizona State || 18-12 || 40-18 || 17-12
|- align="center" bgcolor="#ddffdd"
| May 18 || Arizona State || 22-11 || 41-18 || 18-12
|-

|- align="center" bgcolor="#ddffdd"
| May 22 || vs.  || 26-5 || 42-18
|- align="center" bgcolor="#ddffdd"
| May 23 || vs.  || 9-3 || 43-18
|- align="center" bgcolor="#ddffdd"
| May 24 || vs. Pepperdine || 10-6 || 44-18
|- align="center" bgcolor="#ddffdd"
| May 25 || vs. Pepperdine || 5-3 || 45-18
|-

|- align="center" bgcolor="ddffdd"
| May 30 || vs.  || Rosenblatt Stadium || 8-7 || 46-18
|- align="center" bgcolor="ddffdd"
| June 2 || vs.  || Rosenblatt Stadium || 7-5 || 47-18
|- align="center" bgcolor="ddffdd"
| June 6 || vs. Florida State || Rosenblatt Stadium || 9-5 || 48-18
|- align="center" bgcolor="ffdddd"
| June 7 || vs. Miami (FL) || Rosenblatt Stadium || 2-4 || 48-19
|- align="center" bgcolor="ddffdd"
| June 9 || vs. Florida State || Rosenblatt Stadium || 10-2 || 49-19
|-

Awards and honors 
Gil Heredia
 Third Team All-American
 First Team All-Pac-10 South

Mike Senne
 College World Series Most Outstanding Player
 First Team All-Pac-10 South

Steve Strong
 First Team All-Pac-10 South

Todd Trafton
 College World Series All-Tournament Team
 First Team All-Pac-10 South

Wildcats in the 1986 MLB Draft 
The following members of the Arizona Wildcats baseball program were drafted in the 1986 Major League Baseball Draft.

References 

Arizona Wildcats
Arizona Wildcats baseball seasons
NCAA Division I Baseball Championship seasons
College World Series seasons
Arizona Wildcats base